Musalla Sport Club, is an Iraqi football team based in Kirkuk, that plays in Iraq Division Two.

Managerial history
 Sawash Qader

See also 
 2020–21 Iraq FA Cup
 2021–22 Iraq FA Cup

References

External links
 Musalla SC on Goalzz.com
 Iraq Clubs- Foundation Dates

2003 establishments in Iraq
Association football clubs established in 2003
Football clubs in Kirkuk